Taras Protsyuk (January 16, 1968 – April 8, 2003) was a Ukrainian TV cameraman working for Reuters, who was killed during the 2003 U.S.-led invasion of Iraq.

Biography
Born in Ivano-Frankivsk (Ukraine), Protsyuk was based and lived in Warsaw (Poland) since 1999 and worked as a cameraman for Reuters since 1993. During his career he covered the conflicts in Afghanistan, Bosnia, Chechnya, Kosovo and made news reports about Poland. Protsyuk was in line to gain Polish citizenship. Protsyuk is survived by his wife and an eight-year-old son, the family had moved from Kyiv to Warsaw in 1999.

Death
Protsyuk died on April 8, 2003 (April 8, 2003 journalist deaths by U.S. fire). Protsyuk was filming from a balcony of the Palestine Hotel in Baghdad, where most of the foreign journalists were staying, when a shell fired by a U.S. M1 Abrams tank killed him and José Couso, a cameraman for the Spanish television station Telecinco. The U.S. soldier commanding the tank was Sgt. Shawn Gibson of the U.S. 3rd Infantry Division. On the same day, a total of three locations in Baghdad housing journalists were fired upon by U.S. armed forces, killing three journalists and wounding four.

There were conflicting reports about the nature of the shelling that killed Protsyuk. In the immediate aftermath of the incident, U.S. military officials claimed one of their tanks had fired on the hotel in response to incoming sniper and rocket fire. However, journalists in the hotel at the time of the shelling, claimed to have heard no fire coming from the hotel. Moreover, the accidental nature of the incident was subject to further questioning when a former military intelligence official revealed in 2008 that the Palestine Hotel had been listed as a military target prior to the 2003 incident.

Remembrance
Hundreds, including politicians and public figures, attended his funeral in Kyiv on April 13, and the Ukrainian parliament observed a minute of silence in his memory.

On April 8 the United States Embassy in Kyiv is annually picketed in his memory.

References

External links

 Account of events on day Protsyuk was killed
  Taras Protsyuk captured some of this region's worst moments
 Spanish court absolves U.S. of criminal responsibility in Protsyuk's death - IFEX
 Five-year anniversary photo-memorial from Reuters
 

1968 births
2003 deaths
Ukrainian television journalists
Journalists killed while covering the Iraq War
Reuters people
Polish people of Ukrainian descent
People from Ivano-Frankivsk
Burials at Baikove Cemetery